Tučna is a small settlement in the hills northeast of the town of Kamnik in Upper Carniola region of Slovenia.

References

External links
Tučna on Geopedia

Populated places in the Municipality of Kamnik